Francis Onyiso (born 16 November 1972) is a Kenyan footballer. He played in 51 matches for the Kenya national football team from 1996 to 2011. He was also named in Kenya's squad for the 2004 African Cup of Nations tournament.

References

1972 births
Living people
Kenyan footballers
Kenya international footballers
2004 African Cup of Nations players
Place of birth missing (living people)
Association football goalkeepers
Ulinzi Stars F.C. players